Alniaria folgneri (syn. Sorbus folgneri), Folgner's whitebeam, is a species of flowering plant in the family Rosaceae, native to central China. A small tree, the abaxial side of its soft leaves are covered in a silvery-white tomentose layer. Its autumn foliage often turns golden pink, set off by the white undersides, but the intensity of the color varies from year to year. Its cultivar 'Emiel' has gained the Royal Horticultural Society's Award of Garden Merit.

References

folgneri
Trees of China
Endemic flora of China
Plants described in 2018